Thomas or Tom Webster may refer to:
Sir Thomas Webster, 1st Baronet (1679–1751), English MP
Thomas Webster (painter) (1800–1886), English figure painter
Thomas Webster (lawyer) (1810–1875), English lawyer
Sir Thomas Lonsdale Webster (1868–1930), British civil servant 
T. B. L. Webster (Thomas Bertram Lonsdale Webster, 1905–1974), English archaeologist
Thomas Webster (sailor) (1910–1981), American Olympic sailor
Thomas Webster (geologist) (1772–1844), Scottish geologist
Tom Webster (ice hockey) (1948–2020), Canadian ice hockey player and coach
Tom Webster (cartoonist) (1886–1962), British cartoonist and caricaturist
Tom Webster (politician) (born 1950), former Labor Party member of the New South Wales Legislative Assembly
Thomas J. Webster (born 1971), American engineer
Tom Webster (architect), British-born New Zealand architect and television presenter

See also
Thomas Webster Rammell (died 1879), English engineer